ERIKA Enterprise is a real-time operating system (RTOS) kernel for embedded systems, which is OSEK/VDX certified. It is free and open source software released under a GNU General Public License (GPL). The RTOS also includes RT-Druid, an integrated development environment (IDE) based on Eclipse.

ERIKA Enterprise implements various conformance classes, including the standard OSEK/VDX conformance classes BCC1, BCC2, ECC1, ECC2, CCCA, and CCCB. Also, ERIKA provides other custom conformance classes named FP (fixed priority), EDF (earliest deadline first scheduling), and FRSH (an implementation of resource reservation protocols).

Due to the collaboration with the Tool & Methodologies team of Magneti Marelli Powertrain & Electronics, the automotive kernel (BCC1, BCC2, ECC1, ECC2, multicore, memory protection, and kernel fixed priority with Diab 5.5.1 compiler) is MISRA C 2004 compliant using FlexeLint 9.00h under the configuration suggested by Magneti Marelli.

In August 2012 ERIKA Enterprise officially received the OSEK/VDX certification; see below.

History 
ERIKA Enterprise began in the year 2000 with the aim to support multicore devices for the automotive markets.
The main milestones are:
 2000: support for STMicroelectronics ST10
 2001: support for ARM7
 2002: support for Janus, a prototype dual ARM7 system for the automotive market
 2004: support for Hitachi H8
 2005: support for Altera Nios II, with support for partitioning on multicore designs; availability of the RT-Druid code generator
 2006: support for Microchip dsPIC
 2007: support for Atmel AVR Micaz
 2009: announced ERIKA website on TuxFamily
 2010: support for TriCore, Freescale S12XS, Freescale PowerPC 5000 PPC MPC5674F Mamba, Microchip PIC24, Microchip PIC32, Lattice MICO32, eSi-RISC
 2011: support for Texas Instruments MSP430, Renesas R2xx, Freescale S12G, Freescale PowerPC 5000 PPC MPC5668G Fado
 2012: support for ARM Cortex-M, Atmel AVR (Arduino), TI Stellaris Cortex M4, Freescale PowerPC 5000 PPC MPC5643L Leopard, NXP LPCXpresso. ERIKA Enterprise received OSEK/VDX certification.
 2013: ERIKA Enterprise is supported by E4Coder automatic code generation tool.
 2014: OSEK/VDX certification for Tricore AURIX
 2017: RTOS was rewritten from scratch; new version (3) has proper support for multicore platforms (i.e., one binary for multiple cores), better support for memory protection, and an easier build system. The source code is now maintained on a GitHub repository.
 2018: Multicore and AUTOSAR Scalability Class 1 added to ERIKA3. Graphical editor now available for the OIL file.

Licensing 
Version 2 of the RTOS was released under GPL linking exception. Version 3 of the RTOS (also called ERIKA3) is released under plain GNU General Public License (GPL), with the linking exception sold on request.

Industrial usage 
 In 2010, Cobra Automotive Technology announced support for ERIKA Enterprise
 In 2010, EnSilica and Pebble Bay consultancy ported ERIKA Enterprise to a family of configurable soft processor cores for automotive systems
 In 2010, Magneti Marelli Powertrain announced support for ERIKA Enterprise.
 In 2011, FAAM Spa announced support for ERIKA Enterprise.
 In 2011, Aprilia Racing announced support for ERIKA Enterprise.

Hardware support 
The ERIKA Enterprise kernel directly supports:
 FLEX Boards.
 Easy lab boards
 Nvidia Jetson TX1 and TX2

Other evaluation boards are supported.

References

External links 
 
 
 ERIKA Enterprise wiki

Embedded operating systems
Operating system technology
Real-time operating systems
ARM operating systems
Software using the GPL linking exception